Paul Westwood (born 1953) is an English bass player, composer, educator and author.

Discography

Filmography

Film
 The World is Full of Married Men (1979) for composers Bugatti and Musker
 Lost and Found (1979) for composer John Cameron
 The Legend of the Lone Ranger (1981) for composer John Barry
 Never Say Never Again (1983) for composer Michel Legrand
 Joyeuses Paques (Happy Easter) (1984) for composer Philippe Sarde
 Hors-La-Loi (Outlaws) (1985) for composer Philippe Sarde
 Sid and Nancy (1986) for the Sex Pistols
 Labyrinth (1986) for composer Trevor Jones, David Bowie
 Evita (1996) for composers Tim Rice and Andrew Lloyd Webber
 Little Voice (1998) for composer John Altman
 The Life and Death of Peter Sellers (2004) for composer Richard Hartley
 Bohemian Rhapsody (2018) (bass guitar coach) for composers Queen

Television

 Children’s Hospital theme, ‘Ray of Sunshine’ (1993-2003) for Debbie Wiseman

 A Touch of Frost (1992-2010) for composer Barbara Thompson

 Soldier Soldier (1991–99) for composer Jim Parker

 Shrinks (1991) for composer Debbie Wiseman

 A Royal Gala in aid of The Princes Trust (feat. Robin Williams) (1987) for musical director Alyn Ainsworth

 The Worst Witch (film) (1986) for composer Denis King

 Hotel du Lac (film) (1986) for composer Carl Davis

 Strike It Lucky theme 'Born To Run'(1996–99) for composer Paul Westwood

 Stage Fright, Only Fools and Horses (1991). Personal appearance. for composers Ronny Hazelhurst and John Sullivan

 Only Fools and Horses (1981-2003) for composers Ronny Hazelhurst and John Sullivan

 Bergerac (1981–91) for composer George Fenton

 The Racing Game (1979) for composer Mike Moran

 for Alyn Ainsworth (ITV musical director)
 Live from the Palladium
 Live from Her Majesty’s Theatre
 BAFTA Award Show
 Royal Variety Show
 Jimmy Tarbuck Show
 Surprise Surprise (Cilla Black)

for John Coleman
 Eurovision Song Contest
 Les Dawson Show
 The Best of Les Dawson
 The Best of Tommy Cooper
 Opportunity Knocks (Bob Monkhouse)
 Lena Zavaroni Show

References

Discography
 
 
 Paul Westwood – credits at Rate Your Music. Retrieved 8 April 2019

Interviews
 DMME, Let It Rock (Nov 2004), Interview with John Hiseman. Retrieved 8 April 2019
 Harold Fisher on Paul Westwood. 'Turned Out Nice Again: The Story of British Light Entertainment' (2013).
 Interview with Per Elios Drablos. ‘The Quest for the Melodic Electric Bass: From Jamerson to Spenner’ (2015). Ashgate Publishing.

External links 
 Official Website
 Paul Westwood’s Jazz FX management
 AMA Music book publishers
 DVD publishers

1953 births
Living people
English bass guitarists
English male guitarists
Male bass guitarists